Senator Abate may refer to:

 Catherine M. Abate (1947–2014), former New York State Senator
 Rosa Silvana Abate (born 1963), Italian politician; serving as a senator

Title and name disambiguation pages